The Hawthorn Bridge crosses the Yarra River,  east of Melbourne, Victoria, Australia, connecting Bridge Road and Burwood Road. It is the oldest extant bridge over the Yarra River and is one of the oldest metal bridges in Australia.  It was constructed in the early wave of major new infrastructure funded by the Victorian gold rush. Designed by Francis Bell, it is a substantial riveted, wrought iron, lattice truss structure, with bluestone abutments and piers.

History
Tenders were called on 21 April 1857 by the Board of Land and Works, for erecting the piers for a new bridge and, in the following month, the tender of J. McKenzie was accepted at £10,000. To obtain better foundations, a slight alteration had been made to the proposed site, while the estimated cost, including cuttings from both Burwood Road and Church Street, was £40,000. The specified date for completion of the bluestone piers and abutments was December 1857, but they were not finished until February 1858, and the actual cost was £10,065. The wrought iron truss components were ordered from Britain. However, the ship Herald of the Morning, which carried the bridge components to Melbourne in 1859 as deck cargo, caught fire in Hobsons Bay before it could be unloaded, and was scuttled to extinguish the fire. The consignment bridge materials weighed some 350 tons and, together with its erection cranes, had cost £10,500, so the sinking of Herald of the Morning represented a disaster for Melbourne's metropolitan bridge-building program. The contractors for the bridge were allowed an extension of time to import similar bridge-works from Britain. The ordering, manufacturing and delivery of the new structure delayed completion of the bridge until November 1861.

A newspaper account gives some further details:

After raising the bridge components, Ingles, Adams, and Gresham, brought the material to Sandridge (Port Melbourne). While the firm was negotiating with the Victorian Government to pay £6,000 for the salvaged materials, Ingles made the serious mistake of offering Victoria's Inspector-General of Public Works, Thomas Higginbotham, a two and half per cent commission on the agreed price. A parliamentary row ensued, the negotiations were voided, and the salvage firm was erased from the Government's list of approved contractors.

The pioneer Melbourne foundry of Langlands and Co. purchased the salvaged bridge materials for £2,000, and spent several hundred pounds repairing or modifying the bridge sections. However, there seems to have been no obvious market for the 350 tons of materials, and the foundry ended up selling 200 tons of it to the combined rural shires of Metcalfe and McIvor, who had received a substantial Government grant for the construction of the Mia Mia Bridge at Redesdale. The price was £1,000, and Langlands disposed of the remainder at "scrap iron" rates.  The 200 tons of wrought iron bridge materials had originally been priced at around £6,000, so the Goldfields shires were pleased with their purchase.

The designer of the bridge has not been confirmed, but because it was one of the largest Public Works Department undertakings at the time, it is plausible the Inspector-General of Roads and Bridges in the Public Works Department of the Board of Land and Works, Thomas Higginbotham, himself an accomplished engineer, may have had a hand in it. The design and construction work probably benefited from the knowledge and skills obtained by the Melbourne and Suburban Railway Company when building its bridges at Cremorne and Hawthorn in 1860-1.

In 1885, the Hawthorn Bridge was the destination of Melbourne's first tram service. The bridge was widened in 1890 by extending the piers and abutments and adding additional trusses.

Because the bridge joins two municipalities and is crossed by a tramway, there have always been problems with management, on-going maintenance and finance. In 1928, when funds to repair or replace the bridge were not available, the Richmond City Engineer declared it unsafe and closed it.

The State Government was forced to act and, after much debate, the bridge was repaired, strengthened and widened by the Railways Construction Branch, using in-situ electric arc welding. The timber deck was also replaced with reinforced concrete.
Today, the deck of the bridge retains its 1931 appearance, but the trusses, piers and abutments underneath appear as they were in 1861.

The bridge is listed on the Victorian Heritage Register.

See also
 Glenmona Bridge
 Redesdale Bridge

References

External links

 Rasmussen, C. 1992, 'A Tale of Two Bridges: The Hawthorn Bridge Controversy 1929-30', Victorian Historical Journal, Vol 63 No 1, June 1992.

Bridges in Melbourne
Road bridges in Victoria (Australia)
Bridges over the Yarra River
Heritage-listed buildings in Melbourne
1861 establishments in Australia
Bridges completed in 1861
Truss bridges in Australia
Transport in the City of Boroondara
Buildings and structures in the City of Boroondara
Transport in the City of Yarra
Buildings and structures in the City of Yarra